Tyler Christopher (born October 3, 1983 in Chilliwack, British Columbia) is a former Canadian sprinter who specialized in 400 meters. He is the Canadian record holder for the distance in both indoor and outdoor competition.

In 2004 he won the NACAC U23 Championships. The following year he competed in 400 meters at the World Championships in Helsinki and won a bronze medal, setting a new national record of 44.44 seconds. His personal best in the 200 meters event is 20.49 s, also achieved in 2005.

Christopher's return to the World Championships in 2007 saw him finish sixth in the 400 m. At the 2007 Pan American Games in Rio de Janeiro, Brazil, he won the silver medal in 45.05 s behind Chris Brown of the Bahamas. The race was marred by a controversial start whereas Christopher thought there was a false start, and he slowed to nearly a dead-stop at the beginning of the race.

He was awarded by Athletics Canada the Jack W. Davies trophy as the 2005 outstanding overall athlete and the Phil A. Edwards Memorial trophy as the top athlete in track events.

On March 9, 2008, Tyler won the men's 400 meters title at the 2008 IAAF World Indoor Championships in Valencia, Spain with a Canadian-record time of 45.67 s.

Christopher's coach, Kevin Tyler is also an accomplished athlete. He finished fifth at the Canadian Track and Field Championships in the 400 m, has won the World Wheelbarrow championship in Ladner, B.C and was the brake man for the 1988 Canadian Olympic bobsled team.

At the 2008 Beijing Olympics Christopher ran a disappointing 45.67 s, finishing fifth in his heat and not qualifying for the semi-finals. In an interview with CBC reporter Elliot Friedman after the race Christopher attributed his poor performance to the flu, which had prevented him from training in the days prior to the qualifying event.

Personal bests
Last updated April 19, 2009

All information from IAAF Profile

See also
 Canadian records in track and field

References

External links

1983 births
Living people
Sportspeople from British Columbia
Canadian male sprinters
People from Chilliwack
Athletes (track and field) at the 2007 Pan American Games
Athletes (track and field) at the 2008 Summer Olympics
Olympic track and field athletes of Canada
World Athletics Championships medalists
Pan American Games silver medalists for Canada
Pan American Games medalists in athletics (track and field)
World Athletics Indoor Championships winners
Medalists at the 2007 Pan American Games